The women's 50 metre freestyle event at the 2002 Commonwealth Games was held on 2 and 3 August at the Manchester Aquatics Centre.

Records
Prior to this competition, the existing world, Commonwealth and Games records were as follows:

The following records were established during the competition:

Results

Heats
The heats were held on 2 August, starting at 11:32.

Semifinals
The semifinals were held on 2 August at 19:53.

Semifinal 1

Semifinal 2

Final
The final was held on 3 August at 19:04.

References

Women's 50 metre freestyle
Commonwealth Games
Common